Samuel Hayes (1641 – April 7, 1712) was an early settler of Norwalk, Connecticut. He was a member of the General Assembly of the Colony of Connecticut from Norwalk in the sessions of May 1686, May and October 1687, October 1689, May 1692, May and October 1693, May 1694, May 1695, May 1696, May and October 1697, May and October 1698, October 1699, May 1700, May 1701, October 1702, and October 1703.

He was the son of Nathaniel Hayes (born 1614), and the brother of Nathaniel Hayes, one of the original settlers of Norwalk.

He married Elizabeth Moore, the daughter of Isaac Moore.

References 

1641 births
1712 deaths
Burials in East Norwalk Historical Cemetery
Deputies of the Connecticut General Assembly (1662–1698)
Members of the Connecticut House of Representatives
Politicians from Norwalk, Connecticut
Founding settlers of Norwalk, Connecticut